Štefan "Stevo" Žigon (8 December 1926 – 28 December 2005) was a Yugoslav actor, theatre director, and writer.

Biography

His origins were primarily Italian. He was born in Ljubljana, Slovenia, then part of the Kingdom of Serbs, Croats and Slovenes. His family were Slovene immigrants from the Slovenian Littoral, which was under Italian administration. His father was from the village of Volčji Grad near Komen in the Karst region, while his mother came from the Slovene community in Trieste (now in Italy). The family lived in Trieste until the Fascist takeover in 1922, when they fled to the neighboring Kingdom of Serbs, Croats and Slovenes.

He studied acting in Ljubljana and Leningrad. He graduated in 1952, from the Academy for Theatre Arts in Belgrade. On faculty for acting in Belgrade he was one of the first assistants. Because of his knowledge of the German language and manners, he often played cynical and cold German officers. He was best known for playing "Krieger", chief of Belgrade Gestapo, in the popular 1970s TV series Otpisani and Povratak otpisanih.

During his youth, Žigon was an assiduous reader; he was fascinated by poetry, with his favorite poets being Alojz Gradnik, Igo Gruden, and Oton Župančič.

In 1941, aged 15, as a member of Communist Youth League, he participated in many sabotage actions organized by the Liberation Front of the Slovenian People. In 1942, Žigon was captured by the Italian Army. As a minor, he was spared from execution and spent a year in an Italian military prison in the Province of Ljubljana. After the Italian armistice in September 1943, he was captured by the Wehrmacht and sent to the Dachau (his prisoner number was 61185), where he learned German.

In 1968, at the time of the student demonstrations in Belgrade, Žigon emerged and performed Danton's Death; he played Robespierre for the students. The speech he made while his character was on trial caused the assembled students to explode into enthusiastic applause.

He was married to Serbian actress Jelena Jovanović - Žigon. The couple's daughter Ivana is also an actress.

Filmography

References

1926 births
2005 deaths
Dachau concentration camp survivors
Actors from Ljubljana
Male actors from Belgrade
Serbian male stage actors
Serbian male television actors
Serbian male film actors
Serbian male voice actors
Serbian theatre directors
Theatre people from Ljubljana
Serbian television directors
Serbian film directors
Serbian people of Slovenian descent
Golden Arena winners
Slovenian male television actors
Slovenian male stage actors
Slovenian male film actors
Slovenian voice actors
20th-century Serbian male actors
21st-century Serbian male actors
20th-century Serbian writers
21st-century Serbian writers
20th-century Slovenian male actors
21st-century Slovenian male actors
20th-century Slovenian writers
21st-century Slovenian writers
Serbian dramatists and playwrights
Slovenian dramatists and playwrights
Croatian Theatre Award winners
Burials at Belgrade New Cemetery
Laureates of the Ring of Dobrica
Theatre people from Belgrade